Perth Academy is a state comprehensive secondary school in Perth, Scotland. It was founded in 1696. The institution is a non-denominational one. The school occupies ground on the side of a hill in the Viewlands area of Perth, and is within the Perth and Kinross Council area.

History

While able to claim a strong connection to the Perth Grammar School founded in the 12th century, the name Perth Academy first appears in 1542 when it was founded by the town council, still making Perth Academy one of the oldest schools in Scotland. The first Rector of the school was the Honourable John Murray (later Duke of Atholl); at this time it was considered a purely honourable title, before later being given to the head teacher of the school. By April 1762 accommodation was first provided for the school, in the form of a two-storey building which occupied the site of the current city hall.

At this time education in Perth was provided by a variety of smaller institutions each specialising in a particular field. By the 1800s it was felt that the disparate nature of these, often cramped,  buildings was detrimental to the efficiency and success of the schools. This, combined with a new appreciation of the value of education, led to a new building being built to house the different schools. Designed by Robert Reid, later the King's architect, work on this building was started in October 1803, and finished for the start of the teaching year in 1807. The building housed the Academy (at the time specialising mostly in Maths and the sciences), the Grammar (specialising in mostly Classics, History and Philosophy), the English School, the French school, the Drawing and Painting school, and the Writing school. Together they were known as the public Seminaries, and were housed in what is now known as the Old Academy, on Rose Terrace, near the North Inch of Perth.

This arrangement was continued until 1892, when, under the terms of the 1878 Education Act, control of the schools was transferred from the council to the newly created school board. At this point the term Seminaries was no longer used and the institution began to be officially termed Perth Academy, with the other schools being termed as departments within the school in the 1873 prospectus. Teachers were still paid separately and collected their share of the tuition fees directly from the students in their classes. In 1881 that this was changed, with the fees going into a central treasury before being redistributed.

In 1915 the Academy was amalgamated with the rival Sharp's institution, also located in Perth, leading to a decrease in the fees paid by students.

The school moved to its present site at Viewlands in 1932, construction on the building having begun two years earlier.  The buildings were designed by the Edinburgh architects, and school specialists, Reid & Forbes, one of their late classical works.

Up to 1968 the school was a selective senior secondary school with entrants being required to sit an entrance exam. At this time the schools had a large catchment area of over 642 square miles and including Dunkeld, Kinross, Errol, and Methven. In 1971 the school become a comprehensive school serving all pupils within a smaller catchment area.

Large extensions were added to the school in 1990, including a separate building for a Gymnasium and Games Hall, as well as workshops and an Art studio. The science labs were also renovated at this time with computing rooms being added and suites created for the music and business departments.

Grounds and facilities

Perth Academy is situated in the middle of extensive grounds, stretching to some 11.93Ha, a large part of which comprises sports pitches. The campus is shared with Viewlands Primary School, with many students attending both during their education, and Fairview School, an additional support needs school. The main building for Perth Academy holds all the schools classrooms across two floors, including several science labs, computer rooms, carpentry and metal working rooms, and kitchens for the teaching of cookery. The school canteen is in a separate, smaller building which outside lunch times also serves as a gym room and holds a suite of exercise equipment such as treadmills. There is also a separate block housing the Physical Education department which includes two indoor areas for gym and sports activities. A map of the world has also been painted on the playground as a part of the World at your Feet project run by the Royal Scottish Geographical Society aimed at encouraging the education of school children in geography. In 2014 construction started on a new all-weather pitch, despite resistance from many of the pupils, as the construction meant the removal and destruction of a Scots Pine tree, older than the school itself. The pitch was finished in time for the start of the 2014/15 Summer Term, fully kitted out with football and hockey goals and painted with appropriate pitch lines.

Curriculum
The school follows the national curriculum for Scotland, including the teaching of cooking and technical subjects. In line with Scottish Parliament education policy the school is moving to the new Curriculum for Excellence.

As well as the subjects taught within the school, Perth Academy has established links with other education establishments in Perth including Perth High School and Perth College. These links allow the school to indirectly offer courses outwith its usual capacity to teach.

Extracurricular activities
The school provides a wide range of activities for students and was praised by Her Majesty's Inspectorate of Education for the development of young people through these activities.

The school regularly fields teams for, and hosts, events including hockey and rugby, as well as competing in athletics at county sport level. The school also tries to help develop skills in the pupils as team leaders through activities such as a Sports Leader course and by giving pupils the chance to help lead sports sessions at the neighbouring Viewlands Primary and Fairview schools. There is also netball, table tennis, basketball, badminton, gymnastics, a cheerleading squad and dancing. The school also runs an award-winning "school of rugby"programme for S1 & S2 pupils.  This initiative is jointly funded by the School, Perthshire RFC and Scottish Rugby Union, utilising the "cash back for communities fund"

Awards and recognition
Perth Academy was awarded the silver award in January 2006 for its participation in activities relating to Eco-Schools Scotland. The silver flag award is the middle award between bronze and green. In order to obtain the silver flag award, Perth Academy had to use their initiative to involve some students in activities relating to the following categories: Litter, Energy, Health and well-being, Transport, Waste Minimisation, Biodiversity, School Grounds, Water, Sustaining our world and lastly food and the environment.

The school was inspected by Her Majesty's inspectorate in 2010 and was rated as "satisfactory" or "good" in every category.

Catchment area
The school serves a large, mostly rural, catchment area, split into three distinct areas:
The west of Perth, served by Viewlands, Letham, and Goodlyburn Primary Schools.
The rural area to the north-east of the city, served by Robert Douglas Memorial school, Scone, and Balbeggie, Burrelton, Collace, and Guildtown Primary Schools.
A further rural area served by Arngask Primary school in Glenfarg.

Notable former pupils 

Mili Smith, Olympic gold medalist (curling)
 Arthur Kinmond Bell, whisky distiller and philanthropist
 Arthur Dewar, first-class cricketer
 Michelle Duncan, actress
 Robert Fairbairn, chairman of Clydesdale Bank and first-class cricketer
 John Farquhar, first-class cricketer
 John Forbes, educated here and also taught maths here.
 Fred MacAulay, comedian
 Robert McLaren, first-class cricketer
 Ian McPherson, first-class cricketer
 William Soutar, poet
 Stephen Milne, Olympic medalist swimmer
 Camilla Hattersley, Commonwealth swimmer
 Sir Gordon Duff, principal of St Hilda's College, Oxford 
 Rt Hon Sir David Edward, former Judge of the Court of Justice of the European Communities
 John Sturgeon Mackay, educated here and also taught maths here from 1863 to 1866
 Sir John Chetham McLeod, senior British Army officer
 Robert MacGregor Mitchell, Lord MacGregor Mitchell, lawyer and judge
 David Stewart, first-class cricketer

Notable staff
Edward Smart FRSE (d. 1939), maths master 1899–1915, rector 1915–1930
William Wallace, maths master from 1794

References

External links

Perth Academy on Google maps
Perth and Kinross Council
Old Academy listed register entry

Schools in Perth, Scotland
Secondary schools in Perth and Kinross
1696 establishments in Scotland
Educational institutions established in the 17th century